Goodkind is a surname. Notable people with the surname include:

 Graham Goodkind (born 1966), English businessman
 Henry M. Goodkind (1900–1970), American philatelist
 Morris Goodkind (1888–1968), American engineer
 Terry Goodkind (1948–2020), American writer

See also
 Godkin